Camila Ía González Sodi (born 14 May 1986) is a Mexican singer, actress and model. She is the niece of the singer and actress Thalía and a member of the Sodi family.

Family life
Camila Ía González Sodi was born in Mexico City, Mexico, to Ernestina Sodi Miranda and Fernando González Parra. Through her father, she has two younger half-sisters, actresses Naian Gonzalez Norvind and Tessa Ía.

Career
Sodi began her career as a model and was the host of a music video show on the Mexican cable network TeleHit. She starred in the telenovela Inocente de Ti (2004–2005).

In March 2007, Sodi featured in the film Niñas Mal, directed by Fernando Sariñana, where she shares credits with Martha Higareda, Ximena Sariñana and Blanca Guerra, among other actresses. In August of the same year, Sodi made her feature film debut in the film The Night Buffalo.

In 2015, after 11 years away from soap operas, Sodi confirmed her participation as the protagonist in the production of Carlos Moreno Laguillo entitled A que no me dejas, a version of the successful 1988 telenovela Amor en silencio, produced by Carla Estrada and written by Liliana Abud and Eric Vonn.

In 2020, Sodi starred in the new version of the soap opera Rubí, which featured a 26-episode format under the production of Carlos Bardasano.

Personal life
Sodi was married to actor Diego Luna from 2008 to 2013. They have two children: Jerónimo (born 9 August 2008) and Fiona (born 1 July 2010), named after Luna's mother.

Filmography

Film roles

Television roles

Album
Ella & El Muerto (2013)

See also
Sodi family

References

External links

1986 births
Living people
Mexican child actresses
Mexican telenovela actresses
Mexican television actresses
Mexican film actresses
Mexican female models
Actresses from Mexico City
Singers from Mexico City
21st-century Mexican actresses
People from Mexico City
21st-century Mexican singers
21st-century Mexican women singers
Camila
Mexican people of Italian descent